Daeseongsan is a South Korean mountain in the county of Okcheon, Chungcheongbuk-do.

See also
List of mountains in Korea

Notes

References

Mountains of South Korea
Mountains of North Chungcheong Province